Breakaway is a 1955 British thriller film directed by Henry Cass from a script by Norman Hudis. It stars Tom Conway, Michael Balfour and Honor Blackman. A private eye is hot on the tail of a stolen secret formula and a kidnapped young woman. It is a sequel to Barbados Quest.

Cast
 Tom Conway as Tom 'Duke' Martin
 Michael Balfour as Barney
 Honor Blackman as Paula Grant / Paula Jackson
 Brian Worth as Johnny Matlock
 Bruce Seton as Webb
 Freddie Mills as Pat
 Alexander Gauge as MacAllister
 John Horsley as Michael Matlock
 Paddy Webster as Diane Grant
 John Colicos as First Kidnapper
 Larry Taylor as Second Kidnapper
 Arthur Lowe as Mitchell
 Frederick Schrecker as Professor Dohlmann

Critical reception
In a contemporary review, Today's Cinema called the film "slickly manufactured crime entertainment"; while more recently, TV Guide called it an "absurd whodunit".

See also
 Barbados Quest (1955)

References

External links

1955 films
1950s English-language films
British detective films
Films directed by Henry Cass
Films with screenplays by Norman Hudis
British sequel films
British crime thriller films
1950s British films
1950s crime thriller films
British black-and-white films